Ronald "Ron" Wicks (September 22, 1939 – April 1, 2016) was a National Hockey League referee. His career started in 1960 and ended in 1986.  During his career, he officiated five Stanley Cup finals and 1,400 regular season games. Wicks died of complications from liver cancer on April 1, 2016.

Wicks was born in Sudbury, Ontario and lived most of his life in Brampton, Ontario. Wicks was also director of officiating with the National Lacrosse League.

Honours

 2011 Brampton Sports Hall of Fame inductee
 Sudbury Sports Hall of Fame inductee

References

External links
NHLOA.org bio
Brampton News: Ron Wicks Dies at 76
Sports Commentator Howard Berger Remembers Ron Wicks
Ron Wicks Official Web site
 https://www.facebook.com/RememberingRonWicks/

1939 births
2016 deaths
Deaths from liver cancer
National Hockey League officials
Sportspeople from Greater Sudbury
Sportspeople from Brampton